Rælingen Skiklubb is a Norwegian sports club from Rælingen, founded on 31 March 1930. It has sections for cross-country skiing, ski jumping, and aircross. Their base of operation is Marikollen Ski Center.

Famous members include alpine skier Henrik Kristoffersen and ski jumper Marius Lindvik.

References
Official site 

Sports teams in Norway
Sports clubs established in 1930
Sport in Akershus
Rælingen
Ski jumping clubs in Norway
1930 establishments in Norway